Miladin "Dado" Pršo (born 5 November 1974) is a Croatian former professional footballer who played as a forward.

Pršo played for seven different teams and made over 300 league appearances as a professional. He was included in the Monaco team that reached the 2004 UEFA Champions League Final, and part of the Rangers team that won the League and Cup double in 2005. Pršo received 32 caps for Croatia and was part of the squad at UEFA Euro 2004 and 2006 FIFA World Cup. He retired in June 2007 from the Scottish Premier League club Rangers.

Pršo holds French nationality, thus he was not considered a foreigner during his stay in Ligue 1. He was a coach for a youth team in Villefranche-sur-Mer.

Club career

Early career
Born in Zadar, Pršo began training with the local clubs NK Bagat and NK Zadar before moving to HNK Hajduk Split, at aged 12. He went through the ranks of Hajduk until, in 1991, a medical check allegedly revealed that he had an irregular heartbeat, prompting the team to release him, thinking he was therefore unfit for professional football. Pršo showed no traces of such a defect ever since though. When the Croatian league was formed he joined NK Pazinka, playing his only season at the top level of Croatian football at 18 years of age. In 1993, he moved to France to play for FC Rouen, and then moved to Saint Raphaël in 1995, where he worked as a car mechanic while he continued playing football.

Monaco
In 1996, then-AS Monaco manager Jean Tigana noticed Pršo and bought the forward, although he would spend that season in the reserve side (alongside David Trezeguet), he was sent on loan to AC Ajaccio. In 1999-2000, he helped AS Monaco win the national championship. Pršo also helped them to the UEFA Champions League final in 2004. He is perhaps best remembered for his four goals in the 8–3 win over Deportivo La Coruña (a game which was played on his 29th birthday), which was the highest scoring Champions League scoreline. That night, he also equaled the competition record, joining Marco van Basten and Simone Inzaghi as the competition's top scorer in a single match; this has since been surpassed by Lionel Messi and Luiz Adriano.

Rangers
In May 2004, Pršo signed for Scottish side Rangers on a free transfer. In his first season at the club he played 34 league matches, scoring 18 goals to help Rangers win the Scottish Premier League amid dramatic scenes in the final minutes on the last day of the season; he also won the Scottish League Cup. Departing Rangers manager Alex McLeish hailed Pršo as his "best Rangers signing," at the end of the 2005–06 season.

Pršo remained a member of the 2006–07 Rangers team, despite announcing his retirement from international football. He suggested he would retire from club football on the expiration of his contract in 2007. Despite this, Pršo's agent stated early in 2007 that he would like to continue playing for Rangers if his fitness allowed it, only to announce in February 2007 that his retirement was potentially imminent. Shortly afterwards, it was confirmed that Pršo could play on for a minimum of one season. But this comment proved to be premature as Pršo announced he would part company with Rangers at the end of the 2007 season due to his recurring knee problems. Pršo's agent also stated that he would seek a transfer to a league where physical fitness was not as much of a requirement, rather than end his footballing career completely, and suggested North America and Asia as possible destinations.

At Pršo's last game at Ibrox Stadium, he walked out after the final whistle wearing a brace on his leg due to damage to his ankle. He waved at the 50,000 fans who waited, and was then given the "Guard of Honour" by his teammates, led by Barry Ferguson before going back up the tunnel with tears in his eyes.

It was announced on 8 June 2007 that Rangers would release a DVD featuring highlights of Pršo's three seasons at Ibrox, with a large amount of proceeds donated to the Rangers Charity Foundation.

International career
He made his debut for Croatia in a March 2003 European Championship qualification match against Belgium and earned a total of 32 caps, scoring 9 goals. Pršo was part of the Croatian team at UEFA Euro 2004 where he played in three games. Pršo is remembered in this tournament for the one goal he scored against France in Leiria on 17 June 2004. After scoring four goals during qualifying he was selected to represent his country at the 2006 FIFA World Cup. But he scored no goals during the tournament itself (where the team, as in 2004, was eliminated after the first round).

His final international was at that World Cup against Australia.

Personal life
Pršo comes from a Serb family located in Obrovac, Zadar County. His nephew Milan Pršo has mostly played for FK Rad and represented the Serbian national youth team. According to Milan, Dado's parents once lived in Bačka Topola, Serbia, but moved back to Zadar, Croatia.

Pršo and his French wife Carol have two children, Nicoline (born c. 1999) and Lorenzo (born 2001), who is also a footballer.

Career statistics

Club
Sources:

International goals

Honours

Club
AC Ajaccio
Championnat National:  1997–98

Monaco
Ligue 1: 1999–2000
Coupe de la Ligue: 2002–03
Trophée des Champions: 2000
UEFA Champions League Runner-up: 2003–04

Rangers
Scottish Premier League: 2004–05
Scottish League Cup: 2004–05

Individual
 Croatian Footballer of the Year: 2003, 2004, 2005
 SPL Player of the Month: February 2005, May 2005
 Franjo Bučar State Award for Sport: 2005
 SN Trofej Fair-play: 2005
 John Greig Award: 2007

References

External links
 

1974 births
Living people
Sportspeople from Zadar
Serbs of Croatia
Serb diaspora sportspeople
Croatian emigrants to France
Naturalized citizens of France
Association football forwards
Croatian footballers
Croatia international footballers
UEFA Euro 2004 players
2006 FIFA World Cup players
NK Pazinka players
FC Rouen players
ÉFC Fréjus Saint-Raphaël players
AS Monaco FC players
AC Ajaccio players
Rangers F.C. players
Croatian Football League players
Ligue 2 players
Championnat National players
Ligue 1 players
Scottish Premier League players
Croatian expatriate footballers
Expatriate footballers in France
Croatian expatriate sportspeople in France
Expatriate footballers in Monaco
Croatian expatriate sportspeople in Monaco
Expatriate footballers in Scotland
Croatian expatriate sportspeople in Scotland
Franjo Bučar Award winners